AEBS may refer to:

Advanced Emergency Braking System, a safety feature on automobiles
AirPort Extreme Base Station, an Apple Wi-Fi product